Dot Island may refer to:

Dot Island (South Georgia) 
Dot Island in Lake Yellowstone
list of islands of Wyoming